The Battle of Sealand is the debut studio album by American shoegaze band Airiel. It was released August 21, 2007 on Chicago-based Highwheel Records. The album was named after the Principality of Sealand.

According to an article on the Sealand News website, the members of the band were named official lords of Sealand in recognition of naming their album after the micronation. On September 30, 2007, it was announced that Airiel would be the first rock band to perform at Sealand; however, the concert did not take place.

The band lineup for the album's recording included guitarist Chris DeBrizzio, bassist/vocalist Cory Osborne, drummer John Rungger and guitarist/vocalist Jeremy Wrenn. German electronic musician, remixer and Tangerine Dream member Ulrich Schnauss made a guest appearance on the track "Sugar Crystals".

Track listing 
Introduction – 3:28
Thinktank – 4:21
Thrown Idols – 3:32
Sugar Crystals – 5:16
You Kids Should Know Better – 7:59
Mermaid In A Manhole – 4:36
Stay – 6:16
Peoria – 5:13
The Release – 2:48
Red Friends – 5:10
The Big Mash-Up – 14:43
The Sealand – 2:17 [hidden track]

References

2007 albums
Principality of Sealand
Airiel albums